Joseph A. Miller (1847–1928) was a member of the Wisconsin State Assembly during the 1883 and 1885 sessions. Other positions he held include member of the county board of Manitowoc County, Wisconsin, from 1876 to 1879. He was a Democrat.

Miller was born on March 6, 1847, in Christofsgrund, Bohemia, then in the Austrian Empire. His family emigrated to Oconto, Wisconsin, when he was 9 years old. He moved to Maple Grove, Wisconsin, and married Ottilia Bauer (1847–1902), with whom he raised four children. Miller died on August 14, 1928, in Brillion, Wisconsin.

References

1847 births
1928 deaths
American people of Bohemian descent
Austrian Empire emigrants to the United States
People from Manitowoc County, Wisconsin
People from Oconto County, Wisconsin
County supervisors in Wisconsin
Democratic Party members of the Wisconsin State Assembly